USS Rhea is a name used by the U.S. Navy for:

 , a coastal minesweeper launched 9 August 1941
 , a minesweeper launched 14 November 1942

United States Navy ship names